A desire path (often referred to as a desire line in transportation planning), also known as a game trail, social trail, fishermen trail, herd path, cow path, elephant path, goat track, pig trail, use trail and bootleg trail, is an unplanned small trail created as a consequence of mechanical erosion caused by human or animal traffic. The path usually represents the shortest or the most easily navigated route between an origin and destination, and the width and severity of its surface erosion are often indicators of the traffic level it receives.

The concept is ancient, but the term "desire path" was apparently coined in 1958 by Gaston Bachelard in his 1958 book La Poétique de l’Éspace. An early documented example is Broadway in New York City, which follows the Wecquaesgeek trail which predates American colonization.

Desire paths typically emerge as convenient shortcuts where more deliberately constructed paths take a longer or more circuitous route, have gaps, or are non-existent. Once a path has been treaded out through the natural vegetation, subsequent traffic tends to follow that visibly existing route (as it is more convenient than carving out a new path by oneself), and the repeated trampling will further erode away both the remaining groundcover and the soil quality that allows easy revegetation. Eventually, a clearly visible and easily passable path emerges that humans and animals alike tend to prefer.

Parks and nature areas

Desire paths sometimes cut through sensitive habitats and exclusion zones, threatening wildlife and park security. However, they also provide park management with an indicator of activity concentration. In Yosemite National Park, the National Park Service uses these indicators to help guide its management plan.
 Trampling studies have consistently documented that impacts on soil and vegetation occur rapidly with initial use of desire paths. As few as 15 passages over a site can be enough to create a distinct trail, the existence of which then attracts further use. This finding contributed to the creation of the Leave No Trace education program, which instructs travelers in nature areas to either stay on designated trails or, when off trail, distribute their travel lines so as to not inadvertently create new trails in unsustainable locations.

Land managers have devised a variety of techniques to block the creation of desire paths, including fences, dense vegetation, and signage, though none are foolproof. Modern trail design attempts to avoid the need for barriers and restrictions, by aligning trail layout and user desire through physical design and persuasive outreach.

Accommodation
Landscapers sometimes accommodate desire paths by paving them, thereby integrating them into the official path network rather than blocking them. Sometimes, land planners have deliberately left land fully or partially unpathed, waiting to see what desire paths are created, and then paving those. In Finland, planners are known to visit parks immediately after the first snowfall, when the existing paths are not visible. The naturally chosen desire paths, marked by footprints, can then be used to guide the routing of new purpose-built paths.

Other uses of the concept
Images of desire paths have been employed as a metaphor for anarchism, intuitive design, individual creativity, and the wisdom of crowds.

In urban planning, desire paths have been used to analyze traffic patterns for a given mode of travel. For example, the 1959 Chicago Area Transportation Study used desire paths to illustrate commuter choices regarding railroad and subway trips.

In software design, the term is used to describe users' wide adoption of the same methods to overcome limitations in the software. For example, Twitter has "paved" a number of desire paths by integrating them into the service, including @ replies, hashtags, and group discussions.

See also 
 Wayfinding
 Sneckdown

References

External links

Wordspy: Desire Line
Desire Paths
Desire Path subreddit
Tom Hulme's TED Talk on using desire paths for better design and user experience

Footpaths
Cycling infrastructure
Garden features
Landscape architecture
Parks
Pedestrian infrastructure
Psychogeography
Trails
Transportation planning
Types of thoroughfares
Urban design